Heinz Stickel (9 May 1949 – 15 November 2015) was a German footballer who played as a midfielder.

References

External links

AS Nancy official site

1949 births
2015 deaths
German footballers
Association football midfielders
Bundesliga players
North American Soccer League (1968–1984) players
Ligue 1 players
VfB Stuttgart players
1. FC Kaiserslautern players
San Diego Sockers (NASL) players
AS Nancy Lorraine players
SV Röchling Völklingen players
Holstein Kiel players
German expatriate footballers
Expatriate soccer players in the United States
Expatriate footballers in France